This is a list of officials purged and executed by Kim Jong-un since he came into power in North Korea in December 2011.

2012
Kim Chol was a Vice Minister of the Army until he was executed; an anonymous South Korean source claims he was 'obliterated by a mortar round'.
Ri Yong-ho was the Chief of the General Staff of the Korean People's Army until he was allegedly removed and executed.
Ri Kwang-gon was the Governor of the North Korean Central Bank until he was allegedly removed and executed.

2013
Jang Song-thaek was Kim Jong-un's uncle and the Vice Chairman of the National Defence Commission of North Korea until his execution in 2013.
Ri Ryong-ha was the first deputy director of the Administrative Department of the Workers' Party of Korea and an aide to Jang Song-thaek.
Jang Su-gil was a deputy director of the Administrative Department before his arrest and alleged execution.
Jon Yong-jin was the North Korean Ambassador to Cuba until his removal in December 2013. South Korean news reported that he was executed.

2014
O Sang-hon was the deputy security minister in the Ministry of Public Security in the government of North Korea who was reportedly killed in a political purge in 2014. According to sources quoted by the South Korean newspaper The Chosun Ilbo, O Sang-hon was executed by flamethrower for his role in supporting Kim Jong-un's uncle Jang Song-thaek.
Pak Chun-hong was the deputy director of the Korean Workers' Party Administration Department until he was purged.

2015
Choe Yong-gon was the Deputy Minister of Construction and Building Material Industries until his execution in 2015.

2022 

 Ri Yong-ho was reportedly executed in summer 2021 apparently due to the defection of the North Korean Deputy Ambassador to the UK. Ri was also reportedly executed along with five other Ministry of Foreign Affairs officials.

See also
Assassination of Kim Jong-nam

References

North Korean politicians
Prisoners and detainees of North Korea
People executed for treason against North Korea
Executed politicians
Political and cultural purges
Purges in North Korea
21st-century executions by North Korea
Executed North Korean people
Korea, North
Korea, North
Kim Jong-un